The Lepenica is a river in the region of Šumadija, in central Serbia.

The Lepenica springs in the village of Goločelo, southwest of Kragujevac. It receives 37 tributaries, many of which spring on the slopes of the Gledić mountains. It flows into the Great Morava, at Lapovo. It used to be navigable for small vessels, but today is reduced to the minor stream.

Still, the river was known for floods, especially after the streams and creeks from the Gledić mountains rise during the heavy rains. The banks on its course through Kragujevac were arranged for the first time in 1970, after a major flood. The quay was reconstructed and strengthened in 2017–18.

References

External links 

Kragujevac
Rivers of Serbia